Ivan Lendl won in the final 6–3, 6–2 against Jimmy Connors.

Seeds

  Jimmy Connors (final)
  Ivan Lendl (champion)
  Andrés Gómez (semifinals)
  Aaron Krickstein (second round)
  Yannick Noah (first round)
  Eliot Teltscher (quarterfinals)
  Johan Kriek (quarterfinals)
  Scott Davis (quarterfinals)

Draw

Finals

Top half

Bottom half

External links
 1985 Paine Webber Classic Draw

Singles